Syntypistis subgeneris is a species of moth of the family Notodontidae first described by Strand in 1915. It is found in China (Jiangsu, Zhejiang, Anhui, Fujian, Jiangxi, Hunan, Guangdong, Guangxi, Hainan), Taiwan, Japan, Korea, Sikkim and Vietnam.

References

Moths described in 1915
Notodontidae
Moths of Japan